Vladimir Kärk (19 March 1915 – 23 July 1998) was an Estonian basketball player. He competed in the 1936 Summer Olympics.

References

1915 births
1998 deaths
Basketball players from Tallinn
People from the Governorate of Estonia
Estonian men's basketball players
Olympic basketball players of Estonia
Basketball players at the 1936 Summer Olympics